The Ermita de San Miguel de Gormaz is a hermitage located in Gormaz, Spain. It was declared Bien de Interés Cultural in 1996.

References 

Bien de Interés Cultural landmarks in the Province of Soria
Christian hermitages in Spain